American Gothic is an orchestral composition by the American composer Michael Daugherty.  The approximately 20-minute work is composed in three movements inspired by the paintings of the Iowan artist Grant Wood (1891-1942). Daugherty is a native of Cedar Rapids, Iowa, where the piece premiered on May 4, 2013, at Cedar Rapids' Paramount Theatre, with Timothy Hankewich, conductor.

Instrumentation 

Piccolo, 2 flutes, 2 oboes, English horn, 2 clarinets, bass clarinet, 2 bassoons, contrabassoon, 4 horns, 3 trumpets, 3 trombones, tuba, timpani, percussion (3 players), harp, piano, and strings.

Movements 
 On a Roll
 Winter Dreams
 Pitchfork

Reception 
The world premiere of American Gothic received a strongly favorable review, noting the 1,000+ listeners in attendance and the enthusiastic reception of Daugherty's groundbreaking foray into orchestral bluegrass in the third movement.

Discography 
 Michael Daugherty -- American Gothic (2014)

Notes

References 
 Artist's Page, Bill Holab Music. 
 
 
 
 Orchestra Iowa and Timothy Hankewich. Michael Daugherty: American Gothic. (2014) Copyright—Orchestra Iowa/Iowa Arts Media (735885407223)

External links 
 Michael Daugherty website

Compositions by Michael Daugherty
2013 compositions
Compositions for symphony orchestra
20th-century classical music
Grant Wood